A clipper is a fast sailing vessel, generally from the 19th century.

Clipper or clippers may also refer to:

Business
 Clipper Logistics, a British logistics company
 Clipper Teas, branded as "Clipper", a British, fairtrade tea company
 Clipper Windpower, a wind turbine manufacturer
 Clipper (lighter), a brand of lighter

Computing and electronics
 Clipper (programming language), a programming language for dBase III
 Clipper (electronics), a device that restricts the output of an alternating current circuit
 Clipper (video game), a 1982 video game written by John S. Bayes
 Clipper chip, a symmetric encryption integrated circuit developed by the NSA, defunct by 1996, that had a built-in backdoor
 Clipper architecture, 32-bit RISC-like computing architecture

Places
 Clipper, Arkansas, United States, see Miller County, Arkansas#Unincorporated communities
 Clipper, Washington, an unincorporated community in the United States
 Clipper Mountains, Mojave Desert, California, United States
 Clipper Valley, Mojave Desert, California, United States

Sports
 Baltimore Clippers, a minor league professional ice hockey team
 Los Angeles Clippers, a professional NBA basketball team
 Columbus Clippers, a minor league baseball franchise

Transportation

Air
 Boeing 314 Clipper, "Yankee Clipper", a Pan Am and BOAC (British Airways) flying boat
 Martin M-130, "Philippine, China, or Hawaii Clipper", a Pan Am flying boat
 Boeing C-40 Clipper, a military version of the Boeing 737-700C airline transport
 Cessna 303 Clipper, the original model of the Cessna T303 Crusader light aircraft
 Pan Am Clipper, a callsign for Pan American World Airways
 Piper PA-16 Clipper, a small aircraft
 Raj Hamsa Clipper, an Indian ultralight trike design
 Spartan Clipper, a British light touring aeroplane of the 1930s
 Worldwide Ultralite Clipper, ultralight aircraft

Automobiles
 Clipper (automobile), an American automobile make (1956 model year)
 Clipper (steam automobile), built in Michigan in 1902
 Allard Clipper, a microcar produced in London in 1953 and 1954
 Nissan Clipper, two ranges of commercial vehicle
 Packard Clipper, an American automobile model (1941-1947; 1953–1955; 1957)
 Trident Clipper, a British sports car (1966-1974)

Maritime
 , a retired steel-hulled auto and train ferry also known as SS Clipper
 Clipper Group, an international shipping company founded in 1991
 Clipper Navigation, a private company which operates ferries etc. in the Seattle–Vancouver area
 Clipper route, a route for sailing vessels trading between Europe and Australasia, and for modern circumnavigations
 Clipper, a type of cruising yacht, a masthead cutter, used in the Clipper Round the World Yacht Race

Spacecraft
 Delta Clipper, a reusable space vehicle
 Europa Clipper, a mission concept under study by NASA that would conduct detailed reconnaissance of Jupiter's moon Europa
 Kliper or Clipper, a space vehicle developed by the Russian Roskosmos in cooperation with the ESA
Yankee Clipper, the Apollo Command/Service Module for Apollo 12

Other uses
 Clipper (nickname), a list of people
 Alberta clipper, a fast-moving weather system
 The Clipper, a newspaper published in Hobart, Tasmania, from 1893 to 1909
 New York Clipper, a newspaper from 1853 to 1924
 Hair clipper, used to cut hair
 Hedge clipper, a gardening tool
 Nail clipper, used to cut fingernails
 Operation Clipper, a World War II offensive in western Germany
 Clipper barb, an African freshwater fish
 Clipper butterflies, the genus Parthenos and in particular the species Parthenos sylvia
 Clipper card, a smart card for paying transit fares in the San Francisco Bay Area

See also